Bulgarian Canadians (kanadski balgari) are Canadian citizens or residents from Bulgaria or people of Bulgarian descent. According to the 2021 Census there were 33,085 Canadians who claimed Bulgarian ancestry, an increase compared to the 27,260 of the 2006 Census.

History

Origin and numbers
Mass Bulgarian emigration to Canada began in the late 1890s and the early 20th century. Bulgarians primarily settled in Canada's industrial cities, mostly Toronto, Ontario, which was a major centre of Bulgarian migration to North America. Between 1900 and 1944, 19,955 people from Bulgaria settled in Canada; however, this number excludes the mass Bulgarian migration from Ottoman and later Serbian and Greek-ruled Macedonia, Dobruja, southern Thrace, the Western Outlands and Bessarabia, which was indeed the bulk of Bulgarian emigration to Canada. The largest wave of migration from the Kingdom of Bulgaria to Canada was in 1912, when 6,388 people arrived in that country. Other significant waves were those of 1914, consisting of 4,512 people, and 1907–09, which numbered 2,529.

The Canadian Census of 1921 recorded 1,765 people who identified as Bulgarians; of those, 1,378 lived in Ontario. In 1931, self-identified Bulgarians were 3,160 (2,415 in Ontario), while in 1941 they numbered 3,260 (2,553 in Ontario). Other estimates, however, list 10,000 Bulgarians in Canada by 1913, of which 4,000 in Toronto alone, and 20,000 Bulgarians in Canada by 1939. The Bulgarian colony in Toronto mostly consisted of emigrants from Macedonia and the Kostur (Kastoria) region in particular. According to Bulgarian diplomatic and ecclesiastical records of 1936, Bulgarians in Toronto alone numbered 3,500, while other estimates go up to 5,000.

The Bulgarian community in Canada is deeply linked to the Macedonian Canadians. Until World War II, most people who today identify as Macedonian Canadians claimed a Bulgarian ethnic identity and were recorded as part of the Bulgarian ethnic group. In the 1980s and 1990s, the Bulgarian community in Canada spread in larger numbers to the capital Ottawa, Ontario, Vancouver, British Columbia and Montreal, Quebec.

Organizations, religion and education
The first organization of Bulgarians in Canada, the Zhelevo Bulgarian Brotherhood or Zhelevo Benevolence Brotherhood was established in 1907 in Toronto by emigrants from Zhelevo (Antartiko) in Aegean Macedonia. Other Bulgarian organizations were soon established by emigrants from Zagorichani (Vassiliada), Oshtima (Trigono), Smardesh (Krystallopigi), Gabresh (Gavros), Banitsa (Vevi), Buf (Akritas) and Tarsie (Trivuno), all villages in Aegean Macedonia. Bulgarian emigrants from Murgash near Tsaribrod and Bansko also established emigrant organizations. Most such communities were founded in Toronto, though some were based in other Ontario towns like Kitchener, Windsor and Courtland.

The foundations of the Bulgarian Orthodox community in Canada were laid down in 1908 with the first Bulgarian ecclesiastical mission in North America. The priests Hristo Karabashev and hieromonk Theophylactus, who first visited the United States, arrived in Toronto in 1910 and established what is today the Sts. Cyril and Methodius Macedono-Bulgarian Orthodox Parish, which until 1945 remained the only such community in Canada.

In 7 March 1957 the Bulgarian Canadian Society was found.

A Bulgarian school, funded by the Bulgarian Orthodox community, was founded in Toronto as early as 1914: this was also the first Bulgarian school in the Americas. In 1924, this school had 70 pupils and two teachers. By 1928, the number of pupils was 100. Bulgarian adult schools were established by two separate organizations in 1917 and 1920, also in Toronto. Another school for children was founded in Toronto in 1934; Bulgarian schools were also established in Kitchener and Windsor in 1932 and 1936 respectively.

Language

Some Bulgarian Canadians speak Bulgarian, especially the more recent immigrants, while others might not speak the language at all, or speak Bulgarian mixed with English to a lesser or greater extent. Some Bulgarian Canadians understand Bulgarian even though they might not be able to speak the language. There are cases where older generations of Bulgarians or descendants of Bulgarian immigrants from the early part of the 20th century are fluent in the Bulgarian language as well.

Notable Bulgarian Canadians

 Ken Boshcoff
 Nansy Damianova
 Nina Dobrev
 Ivan Dochev
 Alexandra Fol
 Marian Grudeff
 Ignat Kaneff
 Ted Kotcheff
 Ivan Kristoff
 Mesut Mert
 Alice Panikian
 Kroum Pindoff
 Mirela Rahneva
 Ralitsa Tcholakova
 Theodore Ushev

See also
 European Canadians
 Macedonian Canadians
 Bulgarian Americans
 Immigration to Canada
 Ethnic groups in Canada
 Foreign relations of Bulgaria
 Foreign relations of Canada
 Bulgaria–Canada relations
 Embassy of the Republic of Bulgaria in Ottawa
 Bulgarian diaspora
 Bulgarian Eastern Orthodox Diocese of the USA, Canada and Australia

References

Footnotes

Sources
 
 
 Peykovska, P. (2022). The First Generations of Bulgarians in Canada (in Bg). - In: Migration and Social Development, Vol. 2, Sofia: BAS IHS, pp. 15-64.

External links
 Bulgarite v Canada
 Bulway Bulgarian Canadians
 BG Toronto
 BG Canada
  National Capital Region Bulgarian Community Ottawa – Gatineau, Canada
 Bulgarian–Canadian Society of British Columbia, Vancouver
 Macedonian Tribune, Bulgarian newspaper issued out of Toronto
 Bulgarian embassy in Ottawa
  Bulgarian honorary consulate in Montreal
  Bulgarian consulate in Toronto
 Canadian Foreign Affairs and International Trade Office about the relations with Bulgaria

 
 
European Canadian
Ethnic groups in Canada